The Wrocław Open was a golf tournament on the Challenge Tour, played in Poland. It was held in 2008 and 2009, at the Toya Golf & Country Club in Wrocław.

Winners

Notes

External links
Coverage on the Challenge Tour's official site

Former Challenge Tour events
Golf tournaments in Poland
Sport in Wrocław
Recurring sporting events established in 2008